The Underground Astronauts is the name given to a group of six scientists, Hannah Morris, Marina Elliott, Becca Peixotto, Alia Gurtov, K. Lindsay (then Eaves) Hunter, and Elen Feuerriegel, who excavated the bones of Homo naledi from the Dinaledi Chamber of the Rising Star cave system in Gauteng, South Africa. The six women were selected by the expedition leader, Lee Rogers Berger, who posted a message on Facebook asking for scientists with experience in paleontological excavations and caving, and were slender enough for cramped spaces. Within ten days of the post, Berger had received sixty applicants and chose six scientists to make up his expedition team.

The Rising Star Expedition 
In November 2013, the National Geographic Society and the University of the Witwatersrand funded an expedition called the Rising Star Expedition for a twenty-one day excavation at the Rising Star cave system in Gauteng, followed by a second expedition in March 2014 for a 4-week excavation in the Dinaledi Chamber. The first expedition retrieved 1,550 pieces of bone belonging to at least fifteen individuals, found within 1 m2 of clay-rich sediments. Out of the fossil assemblage found, only twenty bones in the human anatomy were not found in the assortment.

The six scientists had to pass through three points of difficult terrain in the cave to reach the bone chamber. The first is referred to as "Superman's Crawl," which required one arm held forward to pass, similar to Superman's flight. They then had to climb vertically up a rock surface, known as the "Dragon's back," and finally pass through a slender opening and descend 30 meters into the Dinaledi chamber. Because of the difficulty of the expedition and their exploration of the Dinaledi Chamber, the six women were given the name "the Underground Astronauts."

Controversy 
Berger's methods in selecting his research team were criticized by some contemporaries. Because of how he called for applicants via social media to investigate new hominin remains, some experts questioned the legitimacy and professionalism of the expedition. He used a similar process when it came time to analyze the recovered remains, once again sending out a call online for those interested in analyzing the remains, specifically looking for early career applicants. Berger was given the nickname "Mr. Paleodemocracy" because of his methods. Some experts began to view the expedition as a media stunt, as the excavation process was documented via daily blog posts, and Berger spoke on radio shows. The data collected was published in open-access journals and scanned in-order to allow the greatest amount of scientists to access and contribute to the study of the fossil data, quite different from the slow and limited access methods used by most paleoanthropologists.

Excavator team
 Hannah Morris, archaeologist.
 Alia Gurtov is a University of Wisconsin – Madison Ph.D. candidate researching the effects of seasonality on hominin foraging at Olduvai Gorge, Tanzania.
 Marina Elliott is originally from Calgary, Canada, and has a master's degree in biological anthropology from Simon Fraser University, Canada.
 Elen Feuerriegel, then a PhD candidate at the Australian National University, studying shoulder biomechanics with Colin Groves in Oldowan stone tool manufacture.
 Becca Peixotto is an archaeologist and Ph.D. student in the Department of Anthropology at American University in Washington, D.C.
 K. Lindsay (Eaves) Hunter is a biological anthropologist and current archaeology PhD student at the University of the Witwatersrand PhD, as well as the Project Manager/Facilitator for the National Geographic "Umsuka" Public Palaeoanthropology Project based in Johannesburg, Gauteng Province, South Africa. The Nat Geo "Umsuka" project has a focus on promoting education, inclusivity, and accessibility regarding the Cradle of Humankind. Following the 2013 expedition, Lindsay married Rick Hunter, one of the co-discoverers of Homo naledi.

See also 
 Rising Star Cave
 Homo naledi
 Dawn of Humanity (2015 PBS film)

References

External links 
  The Women Behind the Discovery of Humankind's Newest (Maybe) Relative   
 Trowel Blazers - Rising Star
  The role of women and youth in discovering Homo Naledi

Women archaeologists
Paleontology in South Africa
Archaeological sites in South Africa
National Geographic Society
University of the Witwatersrand
Archaeological history of Southern Africa
2013 in South Africa
2014 in South Africa